The 1930 Nottingham Central by-election was a parliamentary by-election held on 27 May 1930 for the British House of Commons constituency of Nottingham Central.

Previous MP 
The seat had become vacant on when the constituency's Conservative Member of Parliament (MP), Sir Albert Bennett, had resigned his seat on 7 May.  He had been Nottingham Central's MP since the 1924 general election.

Candidates 
All three candidates were former MPs.

The Conservative candidate was Terence O'Connor, the former MP for Luton, who had lost his seat at the 1924 general election.

He faced a Labour Co-operative opponent Alfred Waterson, who had been Co-operative Party MP for Kettering from 1918 to 1922, but had not contested a parliamentary election since his defeat.

The Liberal Party candidate was Reginald Berkeley, who had been MP for Nottingham Central from 1922 until he stood down in 1924. He had unsuccessfully contested the 1929 general election in Aberdeen North.

Result 

O'Connor held the seat comfortably, with 54% of the votes, and held the seat until his death in May 1940, triggering another by-election.

Berkeley's 16.9% share was a long way below the 53.7% he had won when he last contested this seat, in 1923, reflecting the national decline in the fortunes of the Liberal Party.

Votes

See also
 Nottingham Central constituency
 1940 Nottingham Central by-election
 Nottingham
 Lists of United Kingdom by-elections
 United Kingdom by-election records

References
 
 

Nottingham Central by-election
Nottingham Central by-election
20th century in Nottingham
Elections in Nottingham
By-elections to the Parliament of the United Kingdom in Nottinghamshire constituencies
Nottingham Central by-election